Michael Butler (born 5 January 1976 in Monrovia) is a Liberian retired professional footballer.

Player

Youth
Butler was inducted in the Springfield Massachusetts High School Sports Hall of Fame in November 2009. He was one of 100 inaugural inductees selected from the 100 years spanning from 1900–2000.  During his four years at the University of Massachusetts he held three separate career records in goals scored, assists and overall points.

Professional
In 1998, Butler turned professional with the Western Mass Pioneers.  He tied Luis Orellano for the league lead in goals with fifteen.  Butler was the USISL D-3 Pro League Rookie of the Year.  In 1999, he moved to the Pittsburgh Riverhounds.  Butler was drafted by Columbus Crew in the first round of the 1999 MLS Supplemental Draft with the 9th pick. In 2000, he played for the Hershey Wildcats.  In 2001, he was loaned from Long Island Rough Riders to MetroStars who were in desperate need of strikers due to injuries. In his only match for the Metros, Butler scored the game winner off a Daniel Hernández cross in extra time against Tampa Bay.

Management 
After assistant coaching stints at American International College, SUNY Purchase, and George Washington University, Butler currently serves as head coach for the Women's team at Berkeley College.  He is also the Director of Soccer Operations at 5 Star Soccer Academy based in Long Island, New York and the Technical Director for the Girls Program at Downtown United Soccer Club (DUSC) based in Manhattan.  Butler currently serves on the National training staff for the United States Soccer Foundation based out of Washington, D.C..

References

External links 
 Profile on MetroFanatic
 

1976 births
Living people
Sportspeople from Monrovia
Liberian footballers
Association football forwards
Liberian emigrants to the United States
UMass Minutemen soccer players
Pittsburgh Riverhounds SC players
Lechia Gdańsk players
Hershey Wildcats players
Long Island Rough Riders players
New York Red Bulls players
Liberian expatriate footballers
Expatriate footballers in Poland
Liberian expatriate sportspeople in Poland
Western Mass Pioneers players
Major League Soccer players
USL Second Division players
A-League (1995–2004) players
Columbus Crew draft picks